Right About Now is an album, released in 2007, by country music artist Ty Herndon. His first major studio album since Steam in 1999, it features the singles "Mighty Mighty Love", previously recorded by Lila McCann on her album Complete, and the title track, previously recorded by Michael Peterson on his 2004 album Modern Man. Also included is a cover of "You Still Own Me", which was originally recorded by Canadian acts Johnny Reid and Emerson Drive, both of whom released the song as singles.

Herndon produced with Jonathan Yudkin on tracks 1, 3, 6, 7-9, with Darrell Brown on tracks 2, 5, 10, and 11, and with Dennis Matkosky on track 4. The album includes backing vocals from Joanna Cotten, Emily West, Marcus Hummon, and Thompson Square.

Track listing
"Someday Soon" (Darrell Brown, Radney Foster, Keith Urban) – 3:54
"In the Arms of the One Who Loves Me" (Brown, Jess Cates, Arnie Roman) – 4:01
"You Still Own Me" (Phillip Douglas, Noah Gordon, Johnny Reid) – 3:12
"Mighty Mighty Love" (Brown, Tim Nichols, Dennis Matkosky) – 3:53
"Right About Now" (Brown, Michael Peterson) – 3:15
"Love Revival" (Marcus Hummon, John Mallory) – 3:29
"Hide" (Kevin Paige, Cates) – 3:56
"Mercy Line" (Brown, Greg Barnhill) – 3:34
"We Are" (Jim Rushing, Ryan Rushing) – 4:15
"If I Could Only Have Her Love Back" (Brown, Matkosky) – 5:04
"There Will Be a Better Day" (Brown, Beth Nielsen Chapman) – 4:09

Personnel
 Robert Bailey - backing vocals
 Lisa Bevill - backing vocals
 Matthew Burgess - percussion
 Perry Coleman - backing vocals
 J. T. Corenflos - guitar
 Joanna Cotten - backing vocals
 Chad Cromwell - drums
 Dan Dugmore - pedal steel
 Bruce Gaitsch - guitar
 Gregg Galbraith - guitar
 Kenny Greenberg - guitar
 Tony Harrell - keyboards
 Jim Hoke - pedal steel
 Marcus Hummon - backing vocals
 John Barlow Jarvis - keyboards
 Craig Krampf - drums
 Chris McHugh - drums
 Greg Morrow - drums
 Alison Prestwood - bass
 Michael Rhodes - bass
 Kim Richey - backing vocals
 Jocelyn Taylor - backing vocals
 Leah Taylor - backing vocals
 Keifer Thompson - backing vocals
 Emily West - backing vocals
 Jonathan Yudkin - strings

Chart performance

References 

2007 albums
Ty Herndon albums
Fontana Records albums